At least three naval vessels of Japan have been named Azuma (sometimes transliterated (archaically) as Adzuma):

 , an ironclad warship of the Imperial Japanese Navy
 , an armored cruiser of the Imperial Japanese Navy
 , a training ship launched in 1969

Imperial Japanese Navy ship names

Japanese Navy ship names